Dina de Marco (née Dinazar Nuñez Jimenez; July 6, 1937 – June 17, 1998) was a Mexican actress and television director. She studied acting in the Academy of Andrés Soler.

Biography 
Dina de Marco started her career as an actress in 1958, and went on to appear in over 20 soap operas, including success as La Pícara Soñadora, with the late Irán Eory, Eduardo Palomo and Mariana Levy in 1991, Alondra in 1995, Sentimientos Ajenos in 1996. Her last soap opera, Esmeralda, was made in 1997.

She was a wife of the actor and director Rafael Banquells. Her children are José Manuel, Rocío, Janette, Mary Paz, Rafael Jr. and Ariadne. She died of cancer on 17 June 1998.

Filmography

Telenovelas

Films

Director

References

External links
 

1937 births
1998 deaths
Mexican telenovela actresses
Mexican television actresses
Mexican film actresses
Mexican stage actresses
Mexican film directors
Mexican women film directors
20th-century Mexican actresses
Actresses from Mexico City
People from Mexico City